Franklin Mountain is a mountain located in Central New York Region of New York south of Oneonta, New York.

References

Mountains of Otsego County, New York
Mountains of New York (state)
Mountains of Delaware County, New York